Dictamnus dasycarpus or chinese dittany is a species of flowering plant in the family Rutaceae, native from southeast Siberia to China and Korea. It was first described by Nikolai Turczaninow in 1842. It has also been treated as only a variety of Dictamnus albus.

References

Zanthoxyloideae
Flora of China
Flora of Korea
Flora of Siberia
Plants described in 1842